Charleston View, formally known as Calvada Springs, is an unincorporated community in Inyo County, California. It lies at an elevation of 2621 feet (799 m). The Charleston View CDP had a population of 45 in the 2020 census

The former name is a portmanteau of California and Nevada.

When the people of Charleston View refer to themselves (known as a demonym), they frequently use Charlestonian.

Demographics

History 

Inyo County defines the Charleston view planning area as 67.875 square miles, which is bigger than the census CDP for Charleston View. Defined as 0.748 square miles.
Within the Planning area, the 2020 Census shows that within Census Tract 8, Blocks 1176-1279, the population is 75.

In 2005, Housing Developers proposed to The Inyo county Board of Supervisors to build 65,000 housing units in Charleston View. This development was greeted with backlash by residents from Neighboring Pahrump, NV, whose main concern was that such development would deplete the ground water in the Pahrump Valley

In 2009, Housing Developers proposed a scaled backed plan that would allow a total population of 40 thousand

In 2012, BrightSource Energy proposed to the California Energy Commission, to build the Hidden Hills Solar Electric Generating System Project in Charleston View, but was withdrawn in 2015  due to concerns over the effects on wildlife, groundwater, cultural and historical resources in the area

Economy
Due to its remote location, the economy of Charleston View is limited. Most revolves around the cultivation of marijuana.

In 2021, Inyo County approved the construction of light industrial building, that would allow for the processing and distribution of marijuana for cultivators in Charleston View and outlying communities in southeastern inyo county.

Politics

Public Safety and Crime 
Law enforcement is provided by Inyo County Sherrif's department. Types of crime in Charleston view normally deal with unpermitted Marijuana cultivation.

Fire Protection is provided by Southern Inyo Fire Protection District

References

Charleston View community plan

Unincorporated communities in California
Unincorporated communities in Inyo County, California